Hariaj (also Romanized as Harīāj) is a village in Hablerud Rural District, in the Central District of Firuzkuh County, Tehran Province, Iran. At the 2006 census, its population was 21, in 9 families.

References 

Populated places in Firuzkuh County